RealD Inc. is a private company known for its RealD 3D system, which is used for projecting films in stereoscopic 3D using circularly polarized light. The company was founded in 2003 by Michael V. Lewis and Joshua Greer.  The company was taken public on the New York Stock Exchange (NYSE) in July 2010, trading under the ticker RLD.  It re-privatized in 2016 by the private equity firm Rizvi Traverse.

Between 2005 and 2007, the company purchased StereoGraphics Inc. and optical components technology company ColorLink, a provider of rear-projection television (RPTV) equipment, polarizing film and optical technologies. RealD developed its technology to create its 3D cinema systems.

References

External links
 

Companies listed on the New York Stock Exchange
Film and video technology
Companies established in 2003
Companies based in Beverly Hills, California